"Ruffneck (Full Flex)" was released as the second single from Skrillex's third EP, More Monsters and Sprites. It was an unofficial song of the London 2012 Summer Olympics. It is featured in the corresponding video game.

Music video
Directed by Tony T. Datis, a music video made its premiere on Skrillex's YouTube channel on December 23, 2011. In the video, a department store Santa Claus who is addicted to drugs has a panic attack while talking to children. The security then chases Santa to a higher floor of the building where they begin to beat him up. After several seconds of being beaten by the security, Santa appears to gain strength and begins to defend himself. He eventually defeats the gang and runs to an outside balcony, where he kneels down and enjoys the falling snow. At the end of the video his nose begins to bleed.

Critical reception
Data Transmission commented on the track by saying "'Ruffneck (Full Flex)' is a constant barrage of bass sounds, glitchy effects and hard synths. With numerous edits, richly characterful bass and the usual catchiness of [Skrillex's] other tracks, Full Flex sees the controversial producer in more familiar territory, packing enormous amounts of detail into every bar."

Charts
The song entered the UK Singles Chart the week of September 17, 2011 at position 89, where it peaked, dropping eight positions the following week to number ninety-seven.

References

2011 singles
Skrillex songs
2012 Summer Olympics
2011 songs
Songs written by Skrillex
Big Beat Records (American record label) singles